Ottavia (/otˈta.vja/) is a Latin origin feminine given name. It is the feminine version of Ottavio and has a variant, Ottaviana. The name means "eighth". Its name day is 20 November in Italy which is celebrated in honor of Saint Ottavio the Martyr.

People with the name include:

 Claudia Ottavia, Roman empress and wife of Nero
 Ottavia Penna Buscemi (1907–1986), Italian politician
 Ottavia Cestonaro (born 1995), Italian athlete
 Ottavia Piccolo (born 1949), Italian actress
 Ottavia Vitagliano (1894–1975), Italian writer, editor and publisher

References

Italian feminine given names
Latin words and phrases